Eye Drops is a television program on TechTV that showcased short computer animation movies and clips made using off the shelf 3D animation software. The show claimed to showcase all different types of animation, but only a very small number of shorts featured non-CG animation. Most animations are done completely by one person or by a small group of people.

Series episodes

Season one

Episode 1, aired May 16, 2002
 It's Alive by Terry Ziegelman and Paul George

Episode 2, aired May 23, 2002
 Bingo by Chris Landreth

Episode 3, aired May 30, 2002
 Wild Card by Van Phan
 Walk by Jeff Drew
 Puppet by Anzovin Studio
 Tung Fu by Gregory Lemons
 F8 (part one) by Jason Wen
 Airheads by Mike Wheeler
 Serenade by Jason Judy, Paul Downs, and Michael Berger

Episode 4, aired June 6, 2002
 Pasta for War by Zach Schlappi
 Animation Lab: Rendering Transparent Materials by Henrik Wann Jensen
 Ruby's Saloon by Kevin "Bubba" Lombardi
 F8 (part two) by Jason Wen
 Considering an Exotic Pet by Skye Carlson
 The Battle Concerto for Two Ninjas by Scott Bazzle
 Hello, Dolly! by Mariko Hoshi
 Irresolve by Tim Benedict
 When Wolfy Met Helga by Mookie Weisbrod

Episode 5, aired June 13, 2002
 Fishman by Dan Bransfield
 Animation Lab: Phimai Temple Tour by Dr. Richard Levy
 Freeware by Alex Orrelle and Mike Kaczmarek
 Sad Robot by Brian Frisk
 Frank 'n' Beanz by David Poole
 The Frogs and the Princess by Scott Jones
 The Metronome Heart by James Ross

Episode 6, aired June 20, 2002
 The Jumper

Episode 7, aired June 27, 2002
 Sketch Modern by Chris McDonnel
 The Poultry Paradox by Carlos Pedroza
 A Ride in the Country by Pat Gehlen
 Stick Figures by Animusic
 Snobe Birds by Jeremy Gibb
 When It's All That's Left by Aaron Halifax

Episode 8, aired July 6, 2002
 In the Vault by Geoffrey Clark
 The Return of Dracula by Pat Chan
 Cerebrium by Bryan Kolupski
 Jumpman Junior by Dairy Haas, Mark Yannitell, and Scott Yannitell
 Emperor Blurgg by Keith Matz
 Woody by Jason Tam
 Puppeteer by Cheryl Sandgren

Episode 9, aired July 11, 2002
 Skating Skip

Episode 10, aired July 18, 2002
 Spotlight: Fiat Lux by Paul Debevec
 Don Gato by Nicholas Smith
 Mortal Skin: Leviathan by Dave Mansfield
 Future Retro by Animusic
 Understanding Chaos part two by Terrence Walker, owner of Studio ArtFX
 From Alice in Wonderland by Lewis Carroll
 Unfair Competition by Joshua Rutter

Episode 11, aired July 25, 2002
 The Terrible Secret of Space by Jonathon Robinson
 The Halls of Montezuma by Dan Bransfield
 Ship of Dream by Kai Zhang
 Groove Street by Robert Winfield
 Token Life by David Donar
 Gawumpi by David Poole
 Abuela Perfecta's Gems by Efrain Rosario
 This Old Mouse by Tav Shande
 Stain X by Kevin "Bubba" Lombardi

Episode 12, aired August 1, 2002
 Womb Wars by Tom Newby
 Animation Lab: Vesuvius Had Spoken by Danic Dabic
 The Funeral by Vic Cherubini
 The Emperor's New Suit by Scott Winston
 Mime in a Box by Eric Kunzendorf
 Robokopf by Brian Frisk

Episode 13, aired August 8, 2002
 The Daydreamer

See also

Spike and Mike's Festival of Animation
Liquid Television
Raw Toonage
What a Cartoon!
KaBlam!
Cartoon Sushi
Oh Yeah! Cartoons
Exposure
VH1 ILL-ustrated
Nicktoons Film Festival
Short Circutz
Funpak
Shorty McShorts' Shorts
Wedgies
Random Cartoons
The Cartoonstitute
Off the Air
Nickelodeon Animated Shorts Program
Too Cool! Cartoons
Cartoon Network Shorts Department
TripTank
Disney XD Shortstop
Go! Cartoons
Love, Death & Robots

Notes

External links
 

TechTV original programming
2002 American television series debuts
2002 American television series endings
2000s American adult animated television series
2000s American anthology television series
American adult animation anthology series
English-language television shows